Happy Hotel is a 2012 Chinese comedy film directed and written by Wang Yuelun and produced by Song Guangcheng and Li Xiang. It stars Jiang Wu as Qian Shiqiang, the vice-president of a company, along with Ning Jing as his wife. The film premiered in China on August 2, 2012. The film follows the lives of a couple and their networking at a five-star hotel named Lotte Hotel.

Plot
Meng Jinghua (Ning Jing) has never been pregnant after her marriage with Qian Shiqiang (Jiang Wu). She has quietly contacts a Korean doctor to come to Lotte Hotel for treatment. That same time, Kim Tai-shun (Jeon Kyeong-ho), a Korean creditor, comes to China for debt, he is arranged to Lotte Hotel by his debtor President Xi (Yao Lu). When he meets Meng Jinghua, he thinks that Meng is a masseuse. On the other hand, Meng Jinghua thinks that Kim Tai-shun is the Korean doctor and invites him to her room. When Kim Tai-shun is flirting with Meng Jinghua, he is battered unconscious by Meng. Meng flees the hotel with deeply fearful, and asks her husband Qian Shiqiang for help. But her husband is caught in bed with his lover Katy (Meng Tongdi) by President Xi. President Xi demands Qian Shiqiang to give him one million yuan as hush money. Qian Shiqiang decides to borrow money from his friends to solve this trouble. The couple meets in the elevator.

Cast
 Jiang Wu as Qian Shiqiang, the vice-president of a company.
 Ning Jing as Meng Jinghua, the president of a company.
 Jeon Kyeong-ho as Kim Tai-shun
 Meng Tongdi as Katy, Qian Shiqiang's lover.
 Liu Hua as President Liu
 Yao Lu as President Xi
 Lam Chi-chung as Du Dachang
 Du Haitao as Liang Wen
 Huang Yi as Meng Jinghua's close friend
 Cheung Tat-ming as Han Chenghuan
 Linda Liao as Xing Guang'ai

Production
Shooting began in September 2011 and ended in June 2012.

The film pays homage to Tony Basgallop's Hotel Babylon.

Release
The film was released on August 2, 2012, in China.

Reception
Douban gave the film 5.2 out of 10 and Mtime gave it 5.6 out of 10.

Accolades
At the 2012 4th Macau International Movie Festival Ning Jing  was nominated for Best Actress.

References

External links
 
 
 

2012 films
2010s Mandarin-language films
Chinese comedy films
2012 comedy films